Babina is a 2000 Ghanaian film written by screenwriters Leila Afua Djansi and Ashangbor Akwetey Kanyi. The film tells a story about a conflict between a witch called Babina, who was sent to the world to destroy the life of man, and the men of God who oppose her. It is an African horror film. Babina is played by actress Kalsoume Sinare.

...the spirit woman Bambina, who snatches the husband of a barren woman, gives birth to an evil spirit child, and terrorizes her environment with her spiritual gaze, which brings sickness, mishap, and death.

Cast 
Kalsoume Sinare
Emmanuel Armah
Berky Perkins
Helen Omaboe
Nii Saka Brown
Nana Baah Boakye
Prince Yawson (Wakye)

References

Further reading
Köhn, Steffen, Videofilm in Ghana, Institut für Ethnologie und Afrikastudien (Department of Anthropology and African Studies), Johannes Gutenberg-Universität, p. 65-70  (thesis) - retrieved 18 Jan 2019
Bilstein, Johannes; Winzen, Matthias, (cont. Heike Behrend, Staatliche Kunsthalle Baden-Baden),  Seele: Konstruktionen des Innerlichen in der Kunst, Volume 1, Staatliche Kunsthalle Baden-Baden (2004), p. 77
The Nordic Anthropological Film Association: The NAFA Film Collection, Ghanaian Video Tales, by Tobias Wendl (2006)  (retrieved 28 March 2019). (The film was featured as part of a documentary program)

External links
Pulse : 8 epic old Ghanaian movies you need to watch again by  David Mawli (03/09/2017)  - retrieved 18 Jan 2019

Ghanaian horror films
2000s English-language films
English-language Ghanaian films